The Fraser-Hickson Institute is a private library that provided free services to the Montreal community. It is closed with its collection in storage, pending a decision on a new location.

History
In 1885, the Fraser Institute opened as the first free library in Montreal. In April 1870, the prosperous local businessman Hugh Fraser drew up his will with the help of his lawyer John Abbott. Less than a month later, Fraser died and the majority of his fortune was spent on "establishing an institution accessible to all honest and respectable people of all ranks and without distinction" with the aim of "helping to spread knowledge by giving free access to books, scientific objects and subjects and works of art to all who wish. ” For more than 70 years, the Institute was located at Burnside Hall, at the intersection of University and Dorchester streets (now boulevards Robert-Bourassa and René-Lévesque).

In 1956, Doctor of Philosophy J.W.A. Hickson bequeathed $ 1.9 million to the Institute on condition that his name be added to the organization's name. Three years later, the Fraser-Hickson Institute moved to the corner of Kensington and Somerled streets, in the Notre-Dame-de-Grâce district. Despite its great success and its cultural value, financial pressures continued to grow until the early 2000s and the building on Kensington Street closed in 2007.

In 2008, the building was sold to a private school. Most of its collection of over 180,000 documents was stored during the search for new sites and partnerships. With the establishment of a network of public libraries by the city of Montreal and the development of new technologies, the Fraser-Hickson Institute was faced with the challenge to renew itself.

In 2013, the library collaborated with the YMCA of Notre-Dame-de-Grâce by installing a library of 200 books in order to support the various programs of the organization. This initiative, led by Executive Director, Helen Fortin, gave birth to the minibiblio concept. Meeting a resounding success, the program continued to develop and expand before finding a new home in 2016. In 2021, after Helen Fortin joined the Fraser-Hickson Board of Governors, Asha Dixit was appointed as Executive Director.

Fraser-Hickson is now located on rue Botrel, in the premises of the Notre-Dame-de-Grâce library. "Today, in a radically different context from that of its birth and by means that its founder would not have imagined, Fraser-Hickson continues its mandate to encourage reading and to strengthen the ability of citizens to read."

References

External links 
 Fraser Hickson Library

Libraries in Montreal
Côte-des-Neiges–Notre-Dame-de-Grâce
Library buildings completed in 1885
Libraries established in 1885
1885 establishments in Canada